KOZI-FM (93.5 MHz) is a radio station broadcasting an adult contemporary music format. Licensed to Chelan, Washington, United States, the station is currently owned by Chelan Valley Media Group and features programming from Westwood One.

References

External links

OZI-FM
Mainstream adult contemporary radio stations in the United States
Radio stations established in 1969
1969 establishments in Washington (state)